Coralliophila fearnleyi is a species of sea snail, a marine gastropod mollusk in the family Muricidae, the murex snails or rock snails.

Description
The length of shell varies between 33 mm and 67 mm.

Distribution
This marine species occurs off India, Japan and Northern Australia.

References

 Oliverio M. (2008) Coralliophilinae (Neogastropoda: Muricidae) from the southwest Pacific. In: V. Héros, R.H. Cowie & P. Bouchet (eds), Tropical Deep-Sea Benthos 25. Mémoires du Muséum National d'Histoire Naturelle 196: 481–585. page(s): 492

External links

Gastropods described in 1965
Coralliophila